Apotomaspis is a genus of flies in the family Stratiomyidae.

Distribution
Nigeria.

Species
Apotomaspis nigeriana Lindner, 1972

References

Stratiomyidae
Brachycera genera
Taxa named by Erwin Lindner
Diptera of Africa
Endemic fauna of Nigeria